Carl Folsom Airport  is a public-use airport located two nautical miles (4 km) west of the central business district of Elba, a city in Coffee County, Alabama, United States. It is owned by the Elba Airport Authority.

This airport is included in the FAA's National Plan of Integrated Airport Systems for 2011–2015 and 2009–2013, both of which categorized it as a general aviation facility.

Facilities and aircraft 
Carl Folsom Airport covers an area of 171 acres (69 ha) at an elevation of 258 feet (79 m) above mean sea level. It has one runway designated 1/19 with an asphalt surface measuring 3,050 by 75 feet (930 x 23 m).

For the 12-month period ending December 9, 2010, the airport had 5,360 aircraft operations, an average of 14 per day: 95% general aviation and 5% military. At that time there were 18 aircraft based at this airport: 78% single-engine, 11% multi-engine, 6% jet and 6% helicopter.

See also 
 List of airports in Alabama

References

External links 
 Aerial image as of 6 March 1997 from USGS The National Map

Airports in Alabama
Transportation buildings and structures in Coffee County, Alabama